Telegeusis nubifer is a species of long-lipped beetle in the family Omethidae. It is found in North America.

References

Further reading

 
 

Elateroidea
Articles created by Qbugbot
Beetles described in 1932